{{Infobox pharaoh
| name           = Psammuthes
| alt_name       = Psammuthis, Pasherienmut
| image          = Statue of 29th Dynasty King Psamuthis LACMA M.71.73.57.jpg
| image_alt      = 
| caption        = Bronze statue of Psammuthes, LACMA.
| role           =
| reign          = 392/1 BC
| dynasty        = 29th Dynasty |
| coregency      =
| predecessor    = Hakor
| successor      = Hakor (restored)

| notes          =
| prenomen       = Userre setepenptahWsr-Rˁ-stp-n-PthPowerful is Ra, chosen by Ptah
| prenomen_hiero = N5-wsr-s-p:t-V28-stp:n
| nomen          = PasherienmutP3-šrj-(n)-MwtChild of Mut 
| nomen_hiero    = p-A17-t-G15
| horus          =Aaphety marsepuˁ3-pḥtj-mˁr-sp.w'| horus_hiero    = O29:F9*F9-V38-O50:Z2
| horus_prefix   = 
| nebty          =
| nebty_hiero    =
| golden         =
| golden_hiero   =

| spouse         =
| children       = 
| father         =
| mother         =
| birth_date     =
| death_date     =
| burial         =
| monuments      =
}}Psammuthes or Psammuthis, was a pharaoh of the Twenty-ninth Dynasty of Egypt during 392/1 BC.

Biography
The place of this king in the dynasty is a matter of debate. Although he is mentioned in three different epitomes of Manetho's Aegyptiaca (Africanus, Eusebius and the Armenian version of the latter) and in the Demotic Chronicle, the sequence of kings is different among these sources and it is unclear if Psammuthes succeeded Hakor, or vice versa.

According to a hypothesis of the Egyptologist John D. Ray, upon the death of Nepherites I in 393 BC, the throne passed to his son and successor, which is likely to had been Hakor. However, it seems that in his Year 2 a usurper, Psammuthes (a hellenized form of the Egyptian name Pasherienmut'''), seized power and deposed Hakor, while proclaiming himself pharaoh.

Both Manetho and the Demotic Chronicle give to Psammuthes a reign length of a year, agreeing with the highest date given by archaeological records, a Mother of Apis stele recording his "Year 1, fourth month of Peret". 
Before the year 2 of Psammuthes, and thus before the "official" year 3 of Hakor, the latter in some way resumed power, and then continued to date his monuments since his first coronation date, simply pretending that the usurper never existed.

Nevertheless, some archaeological records mentioning Psammuthes have survived: the Mother of Apis stele from the Serapeum of Saqqara, a block from Akhmim, and some other findings all from the Theban region. Psammuthes is generally credited to have ordered the construction of a chapel in Karnak, which was later usurped and finished by Hakor. It is also possible, however, that the chapel was started by Hakor before his deposition and further restored by him during his second reign.

See also
Muthis, a presumed claimant'' to the throne during his reign

References

4th-century BC Pharaohs
Pharaohs of the Twenty-ninth Dynasty of Egypt
5th-century BC births
Year of death missing